Sony Music Entertainment Poland Sp. z o.o. (SMEP) is a Polish subsidiary of Sony Music Entertainment. It was founded in 1995 in Warsaw. The label's CEO is Kazimierz Pułaski.

The label was founded after Sony Music Entertainment took over the catalogue of MJM Music PL in late 1995. In 2003, MJM Music PL split from SME Poland and has since run as an independent label.

In 2004, the label merged with BMG Poland and formed Sony BMG Music Entertainment Poland, as of joint venture deal between Sony Music Entertainment and Bertelsmann Music Group. Polish division of Sony BMG included such artists as Big Cyc, Coma, Kayah and Maryla Rodowicz, among others.

In 2008, after BMG was bought by Sony Music, the Polish label returned to the previous name Sony Music Entertainment Poland. The label's most recently signed artists include singer Dawid Podsiadło and the bands Trzynasta w Samo Południe and Bracia.

Artists

Current
 
Alicja Węgorzewska
Andrzej Piaseczny
Ania Teliczan
Ania Wyszkoni
Bracia 
Curly Heads
Cool Kids Of Death
De Mono
Dawid Podsiadło
Dorota Miśkiewicz
Gienek Loska
Grażyna Łobaszewska
Kasia Cerekwicka 
Lady Pank
Lora Szafran
Mika Urbaniak
Monika Borzym
Jan Bo
Paweł Kukiz
Seweryn Krajewski
The Pryzmats
Trzynasta w Samo Południe
Varius Manx
Wilki

Former

Acid Drinkers
Anna Dąbrowska
Beneficjenci Splendoru
Bliss
Brathanki
Braty z Rakemna
Budyń
Chłopcy z Placu Broni
Crew (disbanded)
Dr.no
Farba
Fiolka
Fliper
Georgina Tarasiuk
Groovebusterz
Grzegorz Skawiński
Ha-dwa-O!
Hedone
Indigo
Irena Staniek
Janusz Olejniczak
Jarek Weber
Kasia Klich
Katarzyna Groniec
Katarzyna Skrzynecka
Karolina Kozak
Klatu (disbanded)
Maciej Maleńczuk
Małgorzata Ostrowska
Łukasz Zagrobelny
Marcin Rozynek
Maria Sadowska
Michał Bajor
Monika Brodka
Monopol
Muchy
Myslovitz
O.N.A. (disbanded)
Tatiana Okupnik
Pati Yang
Piotr Karpienia & Witold Cisło
Pogodno
Ptaky
Renata Przemyk
Robert M
Sasha Strunin
Stanisław Hadyna
Strange Days
Tip Top
Tomek Wachnowski
Voo Voo
Zdrowa Woda
Zbigniew Preisner
Zbigniew Wodecki
Zygmunt Staszczyk

See also
 EMI Music Poland
 PolyGram Poland
 Universal Music Poland
 Warner Music Poland

References

External links
 

Polish record labels
Sony Music